Events from the year 1509 in art.

Events
 June 11 – Luca Pacioli's De divina proportione, concerning the golden ratio, is published in Venice, with illustrations by Leonardo da Vinci.

Works

Painting

 Fra Bartolomeo
 Madonna and Child with Saints (altarpiece, Lucca Cathedral)
 The Rest on the Flight into Egypt, with St. John the Baptist (Getty Museum)
 Lucas Cranach the Elder – Venus and Cupid
 Gerard David – The Virgin among the Virgins
 Raphael
Portrait of Tommaso Inghirami
Stanza della Segnatura (fresco, Apostolic Palace, Vatican)
 Titian (previously attributed to Giorgione) – Pastoral Concert (approximate date)

Births
 (born 1509/1512): Niccolo dell'Abbate, Italian Mannerist painter and decorator, of the Emilian school (died 1571)
 Daniele da Volterra, Italian mannerist painter and sculptor (died 1566)
 Leone Leoni, Italian sculptor and medallist (died 1590)
 Danese Cattaneo, Italian sculptor (died 1572)

Deaths
 Pietro del Donzello, Italian painter (born 1452)
 Adam Kraft, German sculptor and master builder of the late Gothic period (born 1455)
 Hans Seyffer, German stone sculptor and wood carver of the late Gothic style (born 1460)
 Shen Zhou, Ming dynasty master in painting, poetry, and calligraphy (born 1427)
 1509/1517: Benvenuto di Giovanni, Italian artist, manuscripts (born 1436)

 
Years of the 16th century in art
1500s in art